is a 1969 Japanese film directed by Kihachi Okamoto and starring Toshirō Mifune and Shima Iwashita.

Plot summary
Gonzo (権三, Toshiro Mifune), a member of the Sekihōtai, is being asked by the emperor to deliver official news to his home village of a New World Order. Wanting to pose as a military officer, he dons a peculiar officer's wig. Upon his return, his attempt to tell the village about a brand-new tax cut is quashed when the townfolk mistakenly assumes that he is there to rescue them from corrupt government officials. He learns that an evil magistrate has been swindling them for years. Now, he has to help the village, ward off Shogunate fanatics, along with the fact that he can't read his own proclamations.

The director, Kihachi Okamoto, is well known for introducing plot twists and surprising endings in his films, and Red Lion is no exception. What starts out as an almost comedic series of misunderstandings between almost comically drawn characters ends up turning far more serious as the film progresses. Tomi (Shima Iwashita), as Gonzo's old flame, is tragically torn between her hopes that Gonzo's new marriage proposal is genuine, and her fears that her life will never improve unless she "goes along" with the corrupt and powerful who rule over the peasant's lives. The film ends with the peasants dancing to the cry of "Ee ja nai ka" ("Why not!?", "Whatever!", or "Nevermind!"), which fatalistically refers to the tumultuous 1866-67 period of Japanese history immediately preceding the imperial restoration and the end of the Edo period.

Cast
 Toshirō Mifune : Gonzo
 Shima Iwashita : Tomi
 Takahiro Tamura : Sagara Sōzō
 Etsushi Takahashi : Ichinose Hanzo
 Nobuko Otowa : Oharu
 Shigeru Kōyama : Aragaki Yaichirō
 Yūnosuke Itō :Kamio Kintarō
 Hideyo Amamoto : Gensai
 Takeo Chii : Spy
 Gorō Mutsumi
 Shin Kishida : Usakichi
 Jun Hamamura : Kanbei
 Sachio Sakai : Kesaji
 Bokuzen Hidari : Gohei

See also
 Eijanaika, a 1981 film by Shōhei Imamura set in the same historical period.

References

External links

1969 films
1960s Japanese-language films
Jidaigeki films
Samurai films
Films directed by Kihachi Okamoto
Films scored by Masaru Sato
Films produced by Toshiro Mifune
Films set in Bakumatsu
1960s Japanese films